The eleventh series of British talent competition programme Britain's Got Talent was broadcast on ITV, from 15 April to 3 June 2017; because the One Love Manchester concert was to take place on 4 June, the live final was brought forward a day to avoid clashing with it. Following the closure of Fountain Studios the previous year, the live episodes were broadcast from Elstree Studios. The change in location allowed for a revamp of the studio used by both the main programme and its sister show, Britain's Got More Talent.

For the first time in eleven years, this series featured no judges' vote for each semi-final – instead the acts getting the highest and second-highest tally of public votes would move on to the live final; after the series' conclusion, Cowell admitted that he disliked this format change. In addition to the judges not voting for an act, the Public Wildcard format was dropped from the show, while the number of acts making it into the semi-finals was reduced to 40, returning to the original semi-final format used prior to the sixth series.

The eleventh series was won by musician Tokio Myers and finishing in first place and magician Issy Simpson finishing in second place. During its broadcast, the series averaged around 9.1 million viewers.

Series overview
Following open auditions held the previous year between October to December, the Judges' audition took place between January and February 2017, within Blackpool, London, Birmingham and Salford. Along with discontinuing the use of the Public wildcard format, production staff changed the rules to suspend the use of the Judges' vote – the change meant that the voting system would be purely conducted by a public vote, with the semi-finalists receiving the highest and second-highest tally of votes respectively automatically securing a place in the live final. This change in format was not announced until 27 May 2017; on 5 June, following the conclusion of the eleventh series, Cowell admitted he disliked this change and had production staff informed it would not be used for the next series.

Of the participants that took part, only forty made it into the five live semi-finals – of these acts, singer Sarah Ikumu, dance group MerseyGirls, comedian Daliso Chaponda, comic magician Matt Edwards, and singer Kyle Tomlinson, each received a golden buzzer during their auditions – with eight appearing in each one – returning to the original arrangement before the sixth series – and eleven of these acts making it into the live final; the wildcard act chosen by the judges was Sarah Ikumu, after she placed 3rd in the public vote in the third semi-final. The following below lists the results of each participant's overall performance in this series:

 |  |  | 
 Judges' Wildcard Finalist |  Golden Buzzer Audition

  Ages denoted for a participant(s), pertain to their final performance for this series.
  Each respective participant(s) auditioned under a different name, before changing them for their semi-final appearance.

Semi-finals summary
 Buzzed out |  | 
 |

Semi-final 1 (29 May)
Guest Performers, Results Show: Alfie Boe & Dame Vera Lynn

Semi-final 2 (30 May)
Guest Performer, Results Show: Camila Cabello

Semi-final 3 (31 May)
Guest Performers, Results Show: Cast  of Bat Out of Hell: The Musical

  Sarah Ikumu was later sent through to the final as the judges' wildcard.

Semi-final 4 (1 June)
Guest Performer, Results Show: Richard Jones

 Cowell asked for his X to be removed during the comments.

Semi-final 5 (2 June)
Guest Performer, Results Show: 5 After Midnight

Final (3 June)
Guest Performers, Results Show: Diversity

 |

Ratings

References

2017 British television seasons
Britain's Got Talent